Porton Meadows is a 17.6 hectare biological Site of Special Scientific Interest in Wiltshire, England, notified in 1988.

Sources

 

Sites of Special Scientific Interest in Wiltshire
Sites of Special Scientific Interest notified in 1988
Meadows in Wiltshire